British Wheelchair Basketball (BWB), formerly named the Great Britain Wheelchair Basketball Association, is a non-profit organisation and the governing body for wheelchair basketball in Great Britain. The organisation represents Great Britain in the IWBF and the women's and the men's national wheelchair basketball team in the British Paralympic Association.

The organisation is responsible for the selection and training of the team that represent Great Britain in international tournaments, including the World Championships and Games of the Paralympiad and the qualifiers therefore, as well as for the promotion of the sport amongst prospective players, spectators, and fans.

References

External links
Official site of British Wheelchair Basketball (BWB)
BritishWheelchairBasketball on Facebook
GBWBA TV

Wheelchair basketball
Great Britain
Disability organisations based in the United Kingdom